Head above Water is a 1986 non-fiction book by Nigerian novelist Buchi Emecheta. It was published in 1986 in the African Writers Series by Heinemann and has been described as "anecdotal autobiography."

Plot summary
Head above Water is an autobiography by Buchi Emecheta. It discusses of her days in Nigeria, down to her life in London at the time as a renowned author.

References 

1986 Nigerian novels
British autobiographical novels
Novels by Buchi Emecheta